Neocononicephora storozhenkoi is the type species of the genus Neocononicephora: an Asian bush cricket, belonging to the tribe Meconematini.

References

External links 

Meconematinae
Orthoptera of Vietnam